San Romano in Garfagnana is a comune (municipality) in the Province of Lucca in the Italian region Tuscany, located about  northwest of Florence and about  northwest of Lucca.

San Romano in Garfagnana borders the following municipalities: Camporgiano, Piazza al Serchio, Pieve Fosciana, Sillano Giuncugnano, Villa Collemandina.

References

Cities and towns in Tuscany